Vincenzo Petrolini (died 1606) was a Roman Catholic prelate who served as Bishop of Muro Lucano (1577–1606).

Biography
On 25 February 1577, Vincenzo Petrolini was appointed during the papacy of Pope Gregory XIII as Bishop of Muro Lucano.
He served as Bishop of Muro Lucano until his death in 1606.

References

External links and additional sources
 (for Chronology of Bishops) 
 (for Chronology of Bishops) 

15th-century Italian Roman Catholic bishops
Bishops appointed by Pope Gregory XIII
1606 deaths